Solothurn West railway station is a railway station in the municipality of Solothurn, in the Swiss canton of Solothurn. It is an intermediate stop on the standard gauge Jura Foot and Solothurn–Moutier lines and is served by local trains only.

The station was the first station in Solothurn. When the current Solothurn railway station was built, it was named Alt-Solothurn (as opposed to the new Neu-Solothurn). Later it became Solothurn West. It is located on Westbahnhofstrasse.

Services 
 the following services stop at Solothurn West:

Images

References

External links 
 
 

Railway stations in the canton of Solothurn
Swiss Federal Railways stations
Solothurn